Canal 13, formerly known as TeleTrece and Trecevisión is a television station headquartered in Guatemala City, Guatemala, with repeaters throughout the country. The network and stations broadcast in the NTSC format.

It is one of the five stations operated by Radio y Televisión de Guatemala, who also operate channels 3, 7, 11 and 23, all of which are linked to Remigio Ángel González through his Albavisión group. The channel mostly airs animated series aimed at children in the daytime, as well as sporting events, TV shows and newscasts.

References

Television stations in Guatemala
Television channels and stations established in 1978